"Headshot" is a song by American rappers Lil Tjay, Polo G, and Fivio Foreign. It was released through Columbia and Sony as the fifth single from the former's second studio album, Destined 2 Win, on March 19, 2021. The artists wrote the song alongside its producers, TNTXD, Tahj Money, Dmac, 101Slide, Bordeaux, and Non Native.

Background and composition
The trap-infused "sinister song" shows the three artists warning others that "any attempt to attack them will not only fail but be met with swift retaliation".

It serves as the first collaboration between all three rappers on the same song together. However, the three drill artists have collaborated with each other individually. "Headshot" serves as the third collaboration between Lil Tjay and Polo G, following Polo's 2019 single "Pop Out" and their joint single "First Place", which was released in 2020. It goes on to mark Tjay and Fivio's fourth collaboration that follows three collaborations in 2020: their joint track "Ambition" and Tjay's two back-to-back tracks "Zoo York" and "Shoot for the Stars", the former of which also features late American rapper Pop Smoke. The song is the second collaboration from Polo G and Fivio Foreign, following their joint 2020 single "Bop It".

Release and promotion
All three artists announced the song and its complete details (cover art and release date) on their respective social media accounts on March 15, 2021.

Music video
After a few days of teasing, the official music video for the song premiered on Lil Tjay's YouTube channel on March 22, 2021. The three artists repeatedly shoot apples off a man's head with guns, somehow killing him at the end, and also race remote-control boats. It takes place in a courtyard outside a mansion. At the end of the Video, Lil Tjay is seen feeding a giraffe, while the then unreleased song "Run It Up" from Destined 2 Win is played.

Credits and personnel
Credits adapted from Tidal.

 Lil Tjay – vocals, songwriting
 Polo G – vocals, songwriting
 Fivio Foreign – vocals, songwriting
 TNTXD – production, songwriting
 Tahj Money – production, songwriting
 Dmac – production, songwriting
 Bordeaux – production, songwriting, mixing, mastering, recording
 Non Native – production, songwriting
 Drü Oliver – recording

Charts

Certifications

Release history

References

2021 singles
2021 songs
Lil Tjay songs
Fivio Foreign songs
Polo G songs
Songs written by Lil Tjay
Songs written by Polo G
Songs written by Fivio Foreign
Columbia Records singles
Sony Music singles